Daniel Dumbravanu (born 22 July 2001) is a Moldovan professional footballer who plays as a centre-back for  club SPAL and the Moldova national team.

Club career
Dumbravanu made two appearances for Zaria Bălți in the 2018 Moldovan National Division.

In 2018 he became a Genoa player.

In January 2020 he went to Pescara on loan.

He never played a match for Pescara and at the end of the loan he came back to Genoa. He made his debut with the Rossoblù on 13 January 2021 in a Coppa Italia game against Juventus.

On 14 August 2021, he joined Lucchese in Serie C on loan. On 29 January 2022, he moved on loan to Siena.

On 12 July 2022, Dumbravanu joined SPAL on a permanent deal until 30 June 2025. He was immediately loaned out to Cypriot club APOEL. Having not found any game time in Cyprus, on 31 January 2023 the defender was re-called by SPAL.

International career
He made his debut for Moldova national football team on 31 March 2021 in a World Cup qualifier against Israel.

References

External links
 
 

2001 births
Living people
Sportspeople from Bălți
Moldovan footballers
Association football central defenders
Moldovan Super Liga players
CSF Bălți players
Serie C players
Genoa C.F.C. players
S.S.D. Lucchese 1905 players
A.C.N. Siena 1904 players
S.P.A.L. players
APOEL FC players
Moldovan expatriate footballers
Moldovan expatriate sportspeople in Italy
Expatriate footballers in Italy
Moldovan expatriate sportspeople in Cyprus
Expatriate footballers in Cyprus
Moldova youth international footballers
Moldova under-21 international footballers
Moldova international footballers